Lac de Castet is a lake in Pyrénées, Pyrénées-Atlantiques, France. At an elevation of 423 m, its surface area is 0.4 km².

Lakes of Pyrénées-Atlantiques